The  is located in Kuki, Saitama. It is the largest centre for medium wave and short wave broadcasting in Japan. It is fed over a 60,000 volt power line and there are two large medium wave broadcasting antennas, one of them 240 metres tall.
The centre is operated by NHK.

External links
 NHK Shōbu-Kuki Rajio Hōsō-sho (in Japanese)

Buildings and structures in Saitama Prefecture
NHK
Towers in Japan